Wasbank is a town in Umzinyathi District Municipality in the KwaZulu-Natal province of South Africa.

Takes its name from the Wasbank River.

References

Populated places in the Endumeni Local Municipality